Women's Polytechnic, Chandannagar, is a girls polytechnic located in Chandannagar, Hooghly district, West Bengal.

About college
This polytechnic is affiliated to West Bengal State Council of Technical Education,  and recognized by AICTE, New Delhi. This polytechnic offers diploma courses in Electronics & Telecommunication Engineering, Architecture and
Computer Science & Technology.

See also

References

External links
 Admission to Polytechnics in West Bengal for Academic Session 2006-2007
Official website WBSCTE

Universities and colleges in Hooghly district
Technical universities and colleges in West Bengal
Educational institutions in India with year of establishment missing